The texas is a structure or section of a steamboat that includes the crew's quarters.  It is located on the hurricane deck, which is also called the texas deck.  This long, narrow cabin is near and may be surmounted by the pilothouse.

History
A steamboat's texas is named in honor of the state of Texas.  This innovation in steamboat construction was introduced about the same time that the state of Texas became part of the United States in 1845.  

In this period, steamboat cabins were conventionally named after states and the officers' quarters were the largest. This structure housing the largest cabins was identified with Texas, which was then the largest state.

Usage
The term became widely known after the publication of Mark Twain's Huckleberry Finn.  In the section in which Huck and Jim encounter a wrecked steamboat:

Variations 

On the Great Lakes, lake freighters have deck houses at the bow and stern with cargo holds in the center. For those, the texas refers to the layer of the deck house that is just below the wheel house / bridge.

References

Steamboats